The Single Standard is a 1929 American romantic drama film from Metro-Goldwyn-Mayer directed by veteran John S. Robertson and starring Greta Garbo, Nils Asther, and Johnny Mack Brown.

This was Greta Garbo's fifteenth film and her second collaboration with fellow Swedish actor Nils Asther, after Wild Orchids.

Plot
Debutante Arden Stuart (Greta Garbo), believes a single standard of conduct should apply to both sexes, one that strives for a combination of freedom, equality, and honesty —in regards to love. Her first attempt is with chauffeur Anthony Kendall, who is secretly a disillusioned "ace aviator" and son of a lord. However their joyous romance ends in disaster, when the young ace commits suicide after being fired because of their illicit affair.

Her longtime admirer Tommy Hewlett (Johnny Mack Brown) wants to marry her, but Arden finds fulfillment after a chance encounter with Packy Cannon (Nils Asther), a wealthy ex-prizefighter turned painter.  He had planned a solo cruise to the South Seas on his yacht, but impulsive Arden sails along with him. After months of idyllic bliss however, he turns around and takes her home, explaining that he needs his full attention for his painting.

Though Tommy knows of Arden's love for Packy, he begs her to marry him anyway. She agrees. Several years go by, and they have a much-beloved son.

However, Packy returns and admits to Arden that he could not stop thinking about her. She is swept away and agrees to sail away with him once again. Tommy confronts his rival at gunpoint, ordering Packy to pretend to reject Arden. In return for the bargain, Tommy promises to arrange a hunting "accident" for himself, so that Arden can be with Packy without starting a scandal, which would hurt his son. Meanwhile, Arden comes to realize that their child means more to her than anything else. She tells Packy she cannot go with him. Tommy, completely unaware of this, still plans to carry out his shooting "accident." Fortunately, Arden intuitively figures out Tommy's fateful plan in time. Suddenly, Tommy gazes out the window, noticing Packy's yacht is sailing away in the harbor, with his family safe at home.

Cast
 Greta Garbo as Arden Stuart Hewlett
 Nils Asther as Packy Cannon
 Johnny Mack Brown as Tommy Hewlett (as John Mack Brown)
 Dorothy Sebastian as Mercedes Stuart
 Lane Chandler as Ding Stuart
 Mahlon Hamilton as Mr. John Glendenning
 Kathlyn Williams as Mrs. Glendenning
 Zeffie Tilbury as Mrs. Handley
 Wally Albright as Arden's young son (uncredited)
 Joel McCrea as Blythe (uncredited)
 Robert Montgomery as Party Guest (uncredited)

Production
Production took place in April and May 1929, in Hollywood, California (USA). Production stills photographs were made by James Manatt and production portraits were taken by Ruth Harriet Louise in May 1929.

This is often referred to as a "silent" film. It is not. Garbo's last three "silent" films, Wild Orchids, The Single Standard and The Kiss, were all non-talking "sound" films with orchestral scores and sound effects, with all dialogue conveyed through title cards, per the traditional "silent" method.

Reception

Critical reception
"Beautifully photographed in the MGM manner by Oliver Marsh, The Single Standard is a prime example of how to tell an essentially "talkie" story within the confines of the silent film."                                                  Hal Erickson, All Movie Guide

Box office
The film garnered receipts of $1,048,000 ($659,000 in the US and $389,000 abroad), vs. a budget of $336,000. It was one of the top-grossing films of the year. The film brought MGM a profit of $333,000.

Home media
The film was released on VHS home video in the 1980s (within Garbo's lifetime) with its original Movietone soundtrack and effects and appears on television with the Movietone. In 2009 The Single Standard was issued on DVD release for the first time.

References

 Greta Garbo: A Cinematic Legacy – by Mark A. Vieira

External links
 
 
 
 
 
 The Single Standard review at The New York Times
 Southseascinema.org

1929 films
American silent feature films
American black-and-white films
1929 romantic drama films
Films based on American novels
Metro-Goldwyn-Mayer films
American romantic drama films
Films directed by John S. Robertson
Films set in China
Films set in the Pacific Ocean
1920s American films
Silent romantic drama films
Silent American drama films